The Legacy Continues... may refer to:

 The Legacy Continues... (Def Wish Cast album), 2006
 The Legacy Continues... (Dream Warriors album), 2002